Selections from Showboat  is a Decca Records compilation album of phonograph records featuring songs from the Jerome Kern / Oscar Hammerstein II musical Show Boat.

Track listing
These songs were featured on a four 10” 78 rpm album set, Decca Album No. A-619. 

Disc 1: (25259)

Disc 2: (25260)

Disc 3: (25261)

Disc 4: (25262)

LP release
The album was also issued as a 10” vinyl LP in 1949 with the catalogue number DL 5060.

LP track listing
SIDE ONE
 “Ol’ Man River”
 “I Still Suits Me”
 “Make Believe”
 “You Are Love”
SIDE TWO
 “Can't Help Lovin' Dat Man”
 “Bill”  
 “Why Do I Love You?”  
 “All the Things You Are”

Other release
The album was also issued as a 4-disc 45 rpm box set in 1949 (Catalogue No. 9-14).

References

Bing Crosby compilation albums
Decca Records compilation albums
1948 compilation albums